Financial planning is the task of determining how a business will afford to achieve its strategic goals and objectives. Usually, a company creates a Financial Plan immediately after the vision and objectives have been set. The financial plan describes each of the activities, resources, equipment and materials that are needed to achieve these objectives, as well as the timeframes involved.

The financial planning activity involves the following tasks:
 Assess the business environment 
 Confirm the business vision and objectives
 Identify the types of resources needed to achieve these objectives
 Quantify the amount of resource (labor, equipment, materials)
 Calculate the total cost of each type of resource
 Summarize the costs to create a budget
 Identify any risks and issues with the budget set.

The role of financial planning includes three categories:
 Strategic role of financial management
 Objectives of financial management
 The planning cycle

When drafting a financial plan, the company should establish the planning horizon, which is the time period of the plan, whether it be on a short-term (usually 12 months) or long-term (two to five years) basis. Also, the individual projects and investment proposals of each operational unit within the company should be totaled and treated as one large project. This process is called aggregation.

References

External links
Prospective Analysis: Guidelines for Forecasting Financial Statements, Ignacio Velez-Pareja, Joseph Tham, 2008
To Plug or Not to Plug, that is the Question: No Plugs, No Circularity: A Better Way to Forecast Financial Statements, Ignacio Velez-Pareja, 2008
A Step by Step Guide to Construct a Financial Model Without Plugs and Without Circularity for Valuation Purposes, Ignacio Velez-Pareja, 2008
Long-Term Financial Statements Forecasting: Reinvesting Retained Earnings, Sergei Cheremushkin, 2008

Financial management
Investment
Corporate development